A steam dummy or dummy engine, in the United States and Canada, was a steam locomotive enclosed in a wooden box structure made to resemble a railroad passenger coach. Steam dummies had some popularity in the first decades of railroading in the U.S., from the 1830s but passed from favor after the Civil War.

Overview
It was thought that the more familiar appearance of a coach presented by a steam dummy, as compared to a conventional steam locomotive, would be less likely to frighten horses when these trains had to operate in city streets. Later it was realized that it was actually the noise and motion of the operating gear of a steam engine that frightened horses, rather than the unfamiliar outlines of a steam engine.

Production

Baldwin Locomotive Works manufactured steam dummies or steam motors for many American tramways.  Baldwin exported to places such as Sydney, Australia - where they were known as 'steam tram motors' - and New Zealand, where two, both built in 1891, survive at museums today.

H. K. Porter, Inc. preferred the term "noiseless steam street motor" in their 20th-century catalog, although they used the term "dummy" (in quotes) in the 19th century. In the 20th century, they offered 0-4-0 and 0-4-2 wheel arrangements. In the 19th century, they also offered a double-ended dummy with a 2-4-2 wheel arrangement. Porter recommended using anthracite or coke as a fuel in order to avoid smoke. Side flaps to hide the mechanism were optional.

In the UK, the Great Western Railway equipped two engines each from the 2021 and 517 classes with coach bodywork between 1906 and 1911.

See also
Doodlebug
Multiple unit
Steam railmotor
Tram engine

References

Steam locomotive types
Steam locomotives of the United States